Stenodemini is a tribe of plant bugs in the family Miridae. There are more than 60 described species in Stenodemini.

Genera
BioLib includes:
 Acetropis Fieber, 1858
 Acomocera Eyles, 1975
 Actinocoris Reuter, 1878
 Asteliamiris Schwartz & Polhemus, 1999
 Autumnimiris Schwartz, 1989
 Caracoris Schwartz, 1989
 Chaetedus Eyles, 1975
 Chaetofoveolocoris Knight, 1968
 Chaetomiris Bliven, 1973
 Collaria (bug) Provancher, 1872
 Cynodonmiris Carpintero & Estévez, 2001
 Dolichomiris Reuter, 1882
 Lasiomiris Reuter, 1891
 Leptopterna Fieber, 1858
 Litomiris Slater, 1956
 Megaloceroea Fieber, 1858
 Myrmecoris Gorski, 1852
 Neotropicomiris Carvalho & Fontes, 1969
 Notostira Fieber, 1878
 Ophthalmomiris Berg, 1883
 Opisthochasis Berg, 1883
 Porpomiris Berg, 1883
 Schoutedenomiris Carvalho, 1951
 Spartinomiris Carpintero & Estévez, 2001
 Stenodema Laporte, 1833
 Teratocoris Fieber, 1878
 Trigonotylus Fieber, 1858

References

 Thomas J. Henry, Richard C. Froeschner. (1988). Catalog of the Heteroptera, True Bugs of Canada and the Continental United States. Brill Academic Publishers.

Further reading

 

 
Hemiptera tribes
Mirinae